Campo Marzio is the 4th  of Rome, identified by the initials R. IV. It belongs to the Municipio I and covers a smaller section of the area of the ancient Campus Martius. The logo of this rione is a silver crescent on a blue background.

History 

Until the domination of Napoleon, in 19th century, the rione was also known by the spelling Campo Marzo.

In the Middle Ages, after the main aqueducts of the city were ruined during the Gothic sieges in 6th century and following to the establishing of St. Peter's Basilica as a focal point for pilgrims, Campo Marzio became one of the most densely populated zones of Rome. The borough was crossed by the procession that used to accompany newly elected Popes from St. Peter's Basilica to their official residence, St. John in Lateran. Moreover, the area was also passed through by the Via Lata, one of the main arteries linking Rome to the rest of Europe, resulting from the merger of Via Cassia and Via Flaminia.

The urban pattern was quite dense, and included several monuments and a number of remains of ancient buildings. Campo Marzio experienced manifold urban renewal interventions during the Renaissance, with the construction of several churches and noble palaces. Pope Paul II redeveloped the Via Lata (the current Via del Corso), Pope Julius II promoted the construction of two straight roads on each shore of the Tiber, Via Giulia on the left shore and Via della Lungara on the right one, between Trastevere and the Vatican. Pope Leo X ordered the creation of a new road connecting Ponte Sant'Angelo to Porta del Popolo, the Via Leonina (Via di Ripetta). In 1570, Pope Pius V promoted the restoration of the Acquedotto Vergine, leading to the creation of new fountains in the area.

New works were undertaken when Rome became the new Italian capital, in 1870, first of all massive walls were built alongside the Tiber, to avoid floods, which were flanked by Lungotevere in Augusta and Lungotevere Marzio. The rione was linked to the near Prati through the construction of Ponte Regina Margherita in 1891, while in 1902 a new bridge (Ponte Cavour) was built downstream, in line with Piazza Cavour, demolishing the Porto di Ripetta.

In 1909, depending on the urban development of Prati, a large demolition project was planned in Campo Marzio, envisaging a new artery climbing down the Pincio and reaching Ponte Cavour. The plan was then modified, and in 1926 a massive refurbishment started in the area near the Mausoleum of Augustus, demolishing about 120 houses and creating a big empty space around it.

Geography

Boundaries
Northward, Campo Marzio is delimited by the Aurelian Walls (alongside Via Luisa di Savoia) and by Piazzale Flaminio, that separates it from Quartiere Flaminio (Q. I). To the north, it also borders with Quartiere Pinciano (Q. III), whose border is marked by Piazzale Flaminio and by the portion of the Aurelian Walls beside Viale del Muro Torto.

Eastward, Campo Marzio borders with Ludovisi (R. XVI), from which it is separated by Via di Porta Pinciana and Via Francesco Crispi.

To the south, it borders with other 3 rioni: Colonna (R. III), from which Campo Marzio is separated by Via Francesco Crispi, Via Capo le Case, Via dei Due Macelli, Via Frattina, Piazza di San Lorenzo in Lucina and Via di Campo Marzio; Sant'Eustachio (R. VIII), whose boundary is defined by Piazza in Campo Marzio, Via della Stelletta and Via dei Portoghesi; and Ponte (R. V), the boundary being a brief stretch of Via dell'Orso and Via del Cancello, up to the Tiber.

To the west, Campo Marzio boundary is the Tiber itself, that separates it from Prati (R. XXII).

Local geography
Piazzas
 Piazza del Popolo
 Piazza di Spagna
 Piazza Nicosia

Roads
 Via Bocca di Leone
 Via Borgognona
 Via dei Condotti
 Via del Babuino
 Via del Corso
 Via della Croce
 Via de' Prefetti
 Via di Ripetta
 Via Margutta
 Via Sistina
 Via Tomacelli
 Via Vittoria
 Via Gregoriana

Places of interest

Palaces and other buildings
 Accademia di belle arti di Roma, in Via di Ripetta.
 Casa di Goethe, in Via del Corso.
 Palazzo Della Porta Negroni Caffarelli, in Via dei Condotti.
 Palazzo Aragona Gonzaga, in Via della Scrofa.
 Palazzo Borghese, in Piazza Borghese.
 Palazzo Boncompagni Cerasi, in Via del Babuino
 Palazzo Capilupi, in Via de' Prefetti.
 Palazzo Corrodi, in Via Maria Adelaide.
 Palazzo Firenze, in Piazza di Firenze.
 Palazzo Gabrielli-Mignanelli, in Piazza Mignanelli.
 Palazzo Incontro, in Via de' Prefetti.
 Palazzo Malta or Palazzo Magistrale, in Via dei Condotti.
 Palazzo Nainer, in Via del Babuino.
 Palazzo Rondinini, in Via del Corso.
 Palazzo Ruspoli, in Via del Corso.
 Palazzo dell'Unione Militare, in Via Tomacelli.
 Palazzetto Zuccari, in Via Sistina, near Via Gregoriana, and Piazza della Trinità dei Monti.
 Villa Medici, in Viale della Trinità dei Monti.

Archaeological sites
 Ara Pacis
 Mausoleum of Augustus
 Amphitheater of Statilius Taurus

Churches
 Santa Maria del Popolo
 Santa Maria dei Miracoli
 Santa Maria in Montesanto
 Trinità dei Monti
 San Rocco all'Augusteo
 Santi Ambrogio e Carlo al Corso
 Gesù e Maria
 San Girolamo dei Croati
 Sant'Antonio in Campo Marzio
 Santa Lucia della Tinta
 Santa Maria della Concezione in Campo Marzio
 Santa Maria Portae Paradisi
 Sant'Ivo dei Bretoni
 San Gregorio Nazianzeno
 San Nicola dei Prefetti
 Sant'Atanasio
 Santissima Trinità degli Spagnoli
 San Giacomo in Augusta
 Resurrezione di Nostro Signore Gesù Cristo
 San Gregorio dei Muratori
 San Giorgio e Martiri Inglesi
 All Saints' Church
 Rome Baptist Church

References

External links

 01
Rioni of Rome